The Women's singles luge competition at the 1994 Winter Olympics in Lillehammer was held on 15 and 16 February, at Lillehammer Olympic Bobsleigh and Luge Track.

Weissensteiner, the defending world champion, had the fastest times in each of the four runs to win the gold medal. Less than three weeks later, the medal was stolen while she was at her brother's funeral when her home in Bolzano was burgled. The Olympic Organizing Committee of Lillehammer gave her a replacement.

Results

References

Luge at the 1994 Winter Olympics
1994 in women's sport
Luge